The Toolbox Murders is a 1978 American slasher film directed by Dennis Donnelly, written by Ann Kindberg, Robert Easter, and Neva Friedenn, and starring Cameron Mitchell, Pamelyn Ferdin, and Wesley Eure. It follows a series of violent murders centered around a Los Angeles apartment complex, followed by the kidnapping and disappearance of a teenage girl who resides there. The film was marketed as being a dramatization of true events, though no source can confirm this. It was briefly banned in the early 1980s in the United Kingdom during the "video nasty" panic.

Plot 
A man dressed in black drives through Los Angeles. Near a car dealership, the man has a flashback of a car accident that occurred at the site which killed a young woman. The man arrives at an apartment complex and kills Mrs. Andrews, a female tenant (who recognizes him) with an electric drill. Afterward, the man dons a ski mask and murders two other women, the first with a hammer and the second with a screwdriver. The police are called and they interview the people who found the bodies, as well as Vance Kingsley, the owner of the building. The next night, the killer strikes again, breaking into the apartment of a woman who is masturbating in her bathtub and shooting her in the stomach and head with a nail gun. The murderer then abducts Laurie Ballard, a fifteen-year-old who lives in the above apartment with her family.

Laurie's brother Joey is questioned by Detective Jamison and, frustrated by the detective's seemingly lax attitude towards Laurie's disappearance, decides to search for his sister on his own. While looking through the homes of the murdered women, Joey meets up with Kent, Vance's nephew, who has been hired to clean up the apartments of the dead tenants. While Joey is helping Kent, Kent mentions that Vance has not been the same since Kathy, (his cousin and Vance's daughter), was killed in a car accident.

It is revealed that Vance is the serial killer, having been driven insane and to religious mania by the death of his daughter. He is killing sinners and has kidnapped Laurie (who is kept tied up and gagged in Kathy's bedroom) to replace Kathy. During a discussion with Detective Jamison, Joey realizes that all the clues point to Vance being the killer, so he goes to the Kingsley house and is followed there by Kent (who had earlier seen the bound and gagged Laurie in his uncle's home). Joey finds bloody tools in Vance's garage, and is confronted by Kent, who sets Joey on fire—burning him to death—to protect his family.

Kent walks in on Vance talking to Laurie, and enrages his uncle by telling him that he and Kathy had an incestuous relationship. Vance and Kent fight, and Kent ends up fatally stabbing Vance with a kitchen knife. Kent goes to Laurie and cuts her bonds with a pair of scissors; Laurie, crying, is  elated to be free and Kent appears to comfort her, but he begins kissing Laurie and then rapes her. Afterward, Kent relaxes on the bed and behaves as if he and Laurie are married and implies that he killed Joey and Vance. Laurie sees the scissors Kent used to cut her free on the bedside table. In the final scene, Laurie, dazed and bloodied, is seen slowly walking through an empty parking lot at dawn, as an intertitle states that the film was a dramatization of events that occurred in 1967 and that Laurie was institutionalized for three years and now resides in San Fernando Valley with her husband and their child.

Cast
 Cameron Mitchell as Vance Kingsley
 Pamelyn Ferdin as Laurie Ballard
 Wesley Eure as Kent Kingsley
 Nicholas Beauvy as Joey Ballard
 Tim Donnelly as Lieutenant Mark Jamison
 Aneta Corsaut as Joanne Ballard
 Faith McSwain as Mrs. Andrews
 Marciee Drake as Deborah
 Evelyn Guerrero as Maria
 Victoria Perry as Woman In Apartment
 Robert Bartlett as Man In Apartment
 Betty Cole as John's Wife
 John Hawker as John
 Don Diamond as Sergeant Cameron
 Alisa Powell as Girlfriend
 Kelly Nichols as Dee Ann DeVore
 Robert Forward as Screamer Man
 Kathleen O'Malley as Screamer Woman
 Gil Galvano as The Man
 James Nolan as Al
 George Deaton as Preacher

Production

Development
Development for The Toolbox Murders began in 1977 when Los Angeles producer Tony Didio wanted to make a low-budget horror film after noticing a successful second release of Tobe Hooper's landmark horror film The Texas Chain Saw Massacre. Didio had been intrigued by the film's financial success and, knowing the film's distributors, contacted them inquiring why the film was being re-released so soon. After a conversation with the film's distributors, Didio decided that he would release his own low-budget horror film. Didio screened the film with writers Ann Kindberg, Robert Easter and Neva Friedenn, giving them the mandate to create a variation of Hooper's landmark film.   According to journalist Linda Gross, the screenplay was loosely based on a string of serial killings in Minnesota committed by a man who attacked women using various tools.

Casting
Wesley Eure was cast in the role of Vance's nephew, Kent, who helps clean the apartment, and who in fact turns out to be an accomplice to his uncle's killings. Eure, who had previously appeared on the series Land of the Lost—which had recently been canceled at that time—agreed to take the role as he had been tired of taking "goody-goody roles. I'd been running from dinosaurs and being the perfect son for years, and now I got to be the killer!"

Filming
Principal photography of The Toolbox Murders began in the summer of 1977 in Canoga Park, Los Angeles at locations on Sherman Way and Vanowen Streets. The film was shot over a total of 18 days, on a budget of approximately $165,000.

Release

Box office
The Toolbox Murders was released theatrically in the United States by Cal-Am Artists, The film was put out on VHS by VCI Entertainment. opening regionally in El Paso, Texas on February 17, 1978. By mid-1978, the film had grossed $512,000 at ninety theaters in the United States. It had its Los Angeles premiere on November 1, 1978.

In 1979, it was selected for screening at the 12th International Festival de Cine Fantástico y de Terror in Sitges, Spain.

Censorship
The film was briefly on the list of the video nasties and was initially banned in the United Kingdom before being subsequently acquitted in court and removed from the Director of Public Prosecutions' (DPP) list. The film was also banned in 1978 by the apartheid Publications Control Board.

Critical reception 
Upon its release, critics complained about the film's misogynistic views towards victimization, and exploitation of women along with its graphic violence and nudity. Linda Gross of the Los Angeles Times lambasted the film as "degenerate, unmotivated, and pornographic trash," summarizing Donnelly's direction as "flaccid and voyeuristic." Fred Beldin from The New York Times criticized the film's characters and villains as "clumsily expressed" and called the films conclusion "incredibly silly" concluding, "as a result, the only enjoyment that can be obtained from the film is ultimately derisive".

Robert Firsching from Allmovie called it "misogynistic" and "nasty", when talking about the film's murder scenes Firsching stated, "None of these things would be quite as shocking if not for the cast, most of whom (save for Cameron Mitchell and Nichols) might have wondered what they were doing in junk like this".

Bill Gibron, writing for DVD Verdict, said the film was "a cut above (no pun intended) your average exploitation horror film" though went on to say "if The Toolbox Murders has one major flaw, it is in the division between the gory slasher and neurotic thriller film" and "The first half is gruesome. The last half is unsettling. But they really are almost two different movies". Another review by the same website was also predominantly positive, stating "Sure it's got gore and nudity galore, but I think it's survived as long as it has because it completely upsets viewer expectations in its second half. By starting out as a typical slasher and ending as a psychological thriller, Toolbox gets under the skin in a way that sticking with one genre or another would not have". The review concluded by saying "it's gory side is gory enough and its creepy side creepy enough to make it worth a watch for those interested in exploitation fare" despite the flat middle half and unrealistic, twist-filled ending.

Jacob Knight of the film criticism website Birth.Movies.Death. praised the film as a "blitzkrieg of brutal, Biblical violence," adding: "Truth be told, The Toolbox Murders is a really nasty affair—utterly unpleasant up until its final moments. But Dennis Donnelly has crafted a San Fernando Valley slice of gnarly exploitation that's sure to please even the most hardcore horror hounds. While the mutilations comes fast and furious, there's not a whole lot of gore to speak of. Instead, there's a fatalistic tone that permeates every frame, reinforced by George Deaton's preposterously portentous score."

The Toolbox Murders holds a 13% rating on Rotten Tomatoes based on eight reviews.

Home media
The film was released on VHS by VCI/Anchor Bay on September 15, 1989.
An edited DVD was released in the UK in 2000 by VIPCO, in 2017 an uncut version was released in the UK by 88 Films. The film was also released as a Special Edition DVD by Blue Underground in 2003, and was re-released on Blu-ray in 2010.

Legacy
The film has gained a cult following in the years after its release, and has been cited by author Stephen King as one of his favorite horror films.

Scott Glosserman claimed to have put an easter egg in his film Behind the Mask: The Rise of Leslie Vernon with the character of Eugene being responsible for the toolbox murders.

In 2004, Tobe Hooper directed a remake simply entitled Toolbox Murders. The film veered considerably from the original plotline and ultimately was better received than the original.

References

Sources

External links 
 
 
 
 
 

1978 films
1978 horror films
1970s exploitation films
1978 independent films
1970s slasher films
American exploitation films
American independent films
American serial killer films
American slasher films
1970s English-language films
Films set in 1967
Films set in apartment buildings
Films set in Los Angeles
Films shot in Los Angeles
Films about kidnapping
Incest in film
American police detective films
American rape and revenge films
Video nasties
Obscenity controversies in film
1970s American films